Temple Prime (September 14, 1832, New York City – February 25, 1903, New York City) was an American amateur conchologist. He studied under Louis Agassiz at Harvard University. He described several new species of the bivalve family Cycladidae.

Prime was also an amateur genealogist, publishing several books on his own family history.

Notes and references

External link 

Conchologists
1832 births
1903 deaths
Scientists from New York City
American genealogists
American malacologists
Historians from New York (state)